V. C. Clinton-Baddeley (1900  1970) was a British playwright, actor, and writer.  Clinton-Baddley also founded Jupiter Recordings Ltd, a company that produced spoken word and poetry set to music, in 1958.  The recordings were made either by the poets themselves, or by actors and scholars.  Jupiter Recordings featured recordings of works by Ted Hughes, Thom Gunn, and Philip Larkin.  Jupiter Records ceased functioning in 1970.

Published works

Plays 

 The Billiard-Room Mystery; or, Who D'you Think Did It: A Murder Mystery in Two Acts 
Aladdin
 Dick Whittington, or, Love is the Key that Opens Every Door
 Sleeping Beauty
 The What D'ye Call it: An Opera (music by Phyllis Tate)

Books 

 Devon
 Words for Music
 The Burlesque Tradition in the English Theatre after 1660
 All Right on the Night
 Some Pantomime Pedigrees
Death's Bright Dart
 My Foe Outstretch'd Beneath the Tree
 Only a Matter of Time
 No Case for the Police
 To Study a Long Silence

References 

1900 births
1970 deaths
British male dramatists and playwrights
British male novelists
20th-century British dramatists and playwrights
20th-century British novelists
20th-century British male writers
British mystery writers